Jõeääre may refer to several places in Estonia:

Jõeääre, Pärnu County, village in Lääneranna Parish, Pärnu County
Jõeääre, Rapla County, village in Märjamaa Parish, Rapla County

See also
Jõeäär, an Estonian surname